Yaygir may be,

Yaygir people
Yaygir language